This is an incomplete list of universities and colleges in Chhattisgarh, India.

Universities
In Chhattisgarh there is one Central university, thirteen state universities and eleven private universities (see table below to view detailed list of universities).

General Degree Colleges
 C.M. Dubey Postgraduate College, Bilaspur
 Durga Mahavidyalaya, Raipur
 Government Engineer Vishwesarraiya Post Graduate College, Korba
 Govt. Bilasa Girls P.G. College, Bilaspur
 Govt. E. Raghvendra Rao P.G. Science College, Bilaspur
 Govt. Jamuna Prasad Verma P.G. Arts and Commerce College, Bilaspur
 Government College, Dipka
 Government Minimata Girls College, Korba
 Jyoti Bhushan Pratap Singh Law College, Korba
 Kamla Nehru College, Korba
 Kirodimal Government Arts and Science College, Raigarh 
 Modern College of Management and Information Technology
 Rungta College of Science & Technology
 St. Thomas College, Bhilai
 Govt.V.Y.T.P.G.Autonomous College, Durg
Government Mukut Dhar Pandey College, Katghora, Chhattisgarh
Government College, Karrtala
Government College, Pali
Government College, Barpali
Government College, Bhaisma
 Govt. Gundhadhur Postgradute College, Kondagaon, Chhattisgarh
 GOVT. MAYURDHWAJ MAHADANI RAJA P.G. COLLEGE, CHAMPA, DIST.-JANJGIR-CHAMPA (C.G.)

Engineering
The engineering colleges in the state include:

 Bhilai Institute of Technology, Durg 
 Central Institute of Plastics Engineering & Technology, Raipur
 Chhatrapati Shivaji Institute of Technology, Durg
 Chhattisgarh Institute of Technology, Rajnandgaon
 Christian College of Engineering & Technology, Bhilai
 Disha Institute of Management and Technology, Raipur
 Government Engineering College, Bilaspur
 Government Engineering College, Jagdalpur
 Government Engineering College Raipur
 International Institute of Information Technology, Naya Raipur
 Indian Institute of Technology Bhilai
 Institute of Technology, Guru Ghasidas University
 Vishwavidyalaya Engineering College, Sarguja University
 Institute of Technology, Korba
 Kirodimal Institute of Technology, Raigarh
 O.P. Jindal University, Raigarh
 National Institute of Technology, Raipur
 Raipur Institute of Technology
 Shri Shankaracharya College of Engineering and Technology, Bhilai
 Shri Shankaracharya Institute of Technology & Management, Bhilai
 Shri Shankaracharya Engineering College, Bhilai
 Shri Shankaracharya Institute of Professional Management and Technology, Raipur
 Shri Shankaracharya Institute of Engineering & Technology, Bhilai
 Shri Rawatpura Sarkar Institute of Technology, Naya Raipur, Raipur
 Shri Rawatpura Sarkar Institute of Technology-II, Naya Raipur, Bhilai
 Parthivi College of Engineering and Management, Sirsakala, Bhilai

Polytechnic
 Government Polytechnic, Khairagarh
 Government Polytechnic, Korba
 Government Polytechnic, Ambikapur
 Government Girls Polytechnic, Bilaspur
 Kirodimal Govt. Polytechnic, Raigarh
 Government Polytechnic, Surajpur
 Shri Rawatpura Sarkar Polytechnic College, Dhaneli Raipur

Handloom
 Indian Institute of Handloom Technology, Champa

Journalism and Mass communication

 Kushabhau Thakre Journalism And Mass Communication University, Raipur

Dental colleges
 New Horizon Dental College and Research Institute

Pharmacy
Shri Rawatpura Sarkar college of pharmacy dhaneli 
Institute of Pharmacy PRSU Raipur

Medical Colleges
 All India Institute of Medical Sciences, Raipur
 CCM Medical College, Durg
 Chhattisgarh Institute of Medical Sciences, Bilaspur
 Chhattisgarh Institute of Medical Sciences and Associated Sardar Patel Hospital, Bilaspur
 Government Medical College, Raigarh
 Government Medical College, Rajnandgaon
 Late Baliram Kashyap Memorial Government Medical College, Jagdalpur
 Pt. Jawahar Lal Nehru Memorial Medical College, Raipur
 Raipur Institute of Medical Sciences

Business Schools
 Shivalik Institute of Management Education and Research, Durg
 Indian Institute of Management Raipur

References 

Shri Rawatpura Sarkar group

Chhattisgarh
Education
Universities and colleges in Chhattisgarh